Spark is an email application for Windows, iOS, macOS, and Android devices by Readdle. Lifehacker wrote that Spark was the best alternative for Mailbox users when that service went offline.

History 

On April 2, 2019, Readdle released Spark for Android, the company's first mobile application for the Android platform.

References

Further reading

External links
 

IOS software
Email clients